Real Time with Bill Maher is an American comedy and political panel talk show hosted by Bill Maher. Maher had previously hosted a similar series entitled Politically Incorrect on Comedy Central and later on ABC from 1993 to 2002. Real Time with Bill Maher premiered on February 21, 2003 on HBO.

Series overview

Episodes

Season 1 (2003)

Season 2 (2004)

Season 3 (2005)

Season 4 (2006)

Season 5 (2007)

Season 6 (2008)

Season 7 (2009)

Season 8 (2010)

Season 9 (2011)

Season 10 (2012)

Season 11 (2013)

Season 12 (2014)

Season 13 (2015)

Season 14 (2016)

Season 15 (2017)

Season 16 (2018)

Season 17 (2019)

Season 18 (2020)

Season 19 (2021)

Season 20 (2022)

Season 21 (2023)

References

External links
 HBO.com Episode List
 Real Time with Bill Maher Free (audio-only) episodes & Overtime podcast direct from HBO
 

Real Time with Bill Maher